Menzel may refer to:


People
Menzel is a surname of German origin.
It can also be a transliteration of the Yiddish surname " מענטזעל "- a variant of the German surname.
 Adolph Menzel (1815–1905), German artist
 Christian Menzel (born 1971), German racecar driver
 Daniel Menzel (born 1991), Australian footballer
 Donald Howard Menzel (1901–1976), U.S. astronomer
 Emil Wolfgang Menzel, Jr. (1929–2012), U.S. primatologist
 Gerhard Menzel (1894–1966), German screenwriter
 Idina Menzel (née Mentzel; born 1971), U.S. actress, singer, and songwriter
 Jiří Menzel (1938–2020), Czech director
 Joachim Menzel (1914–2005), German military officer
 Josef Joachim Menzel (1933-2020), German historian
 Herman Menzel (1904–1988), American artist
 Max Menzel (born 1941), Australian politician
 Paul Julius Menzel (1864–1927), German physician and paleobotanist
 Paul Menzel (born ?), U.S. actor, writer, and producer
 Peter Menzel (born 1948), U.S. photojournalist
 Robert Menzel (born 1991), Polish footballer
 Roderich Menzel (1907–1987), Czechoslovakian and German tennis player
 Rudolphina Menzel (1891–1973), Austrian cynologist and animal behaviorist
 Tim Menzel (born 1992), German rugby player
 Troy Menzel (born 1994), Australian footballer
 Wolfgang Menzel (1798–1873), German poet

Places
 Cape Menzel, on Thurston Island in Antarctica; named for geologist Reinhard W. Menzel

Menzel is also the transliteration of Arabic word into the Latin alphabet which means "House" or "House of ---" (e.g. "Menzel Bourguiba" means "House of Bourguiba"). Many such place names exist, especially in Tunisia, but also Morocco.

Morocco
 El Menzel

Tunisia

 Menzel Abderrahmane
 Menzel Bourguiba
 Menzel Bouzaiane
 Menzel Bouzelfa
 Menzel Chaker
 Menzel Ennour
 Menzel Farsi
 Menzel Hayet
 Menzel Horr
 Menzel Jemil
 Menzel Kamel
 Menzel Mehiri
 Menzel Salem
 Menzel Temime

Other
 Menzel (crater), a lunar crater named for Donald Howard Menzel
 Menzel 3, a young bipolar planetary nebula named for Donald Howard Menzel
 1967 Menzel, an asteroid named for Donald Howard Menzel
 Menzel (Djerba), a Tunisian housing type

German-language surnames